Tales of the South Pacific is a Pulitzer Prize-winning collection of sequentially related short stories by James A. Michener about the Pacific campaign in World War II. The stories are based on observations and anecdotes he collected while stationed as a lieutenant commander in the US Navy at the Espiritu Santo Naval Base on the island of Espiritu Santo in the New Hebrides Islands (now known as Vanuatu).
 
Written in 1946 and published in 1947, the book was loosely adapted in 1949 as the Broadway musical South Pacific, which itself formed the basis of two films dating from 1958 and 2001.

Book
The stories take place in the environs of the Coral Sea and the Solomon Islands. Michener as narrator gives a first-person voice to several of the stories as an unnamed "Commander", performing duties similar to those that he himself performed during World War II.

The stories are interconnected by recurring characters and several loose plot lines. One plot line in particular is the preparation for and execution of a fictitious amphibious invasion, code-named "Alligator". The focus of the stories is, however, the interactions between Americans and a variety of colonial, immigrant, and indigenous characters.

The chronology of the stories begins with the building of an airfield on Norfolk Island before the Battle of the Coral Sea, in 1942, and goes through the early 1944 invasion of one of Michener's fictional islands. Although the stories are primarily about the U.S. Navy, most of the action is shore-based, and none of the stories concerns ships larger than a Landing Craft Infantry.

Adaptations

Musical 
The highly successful musical play South Pacific by Rodgers and Hammerstein, which opened on Broadway on April 7, 1949, was based on the stories in Tales of the South Pacific. In particular, the stories used were "Fo' Dolla'", about Bloody Mary, Liat, and Lieutenant Joe Cable; and "Our Heroine", about Nellie Forbush and Emile de Becque. Characters from other stories, such as Bill Harbison, Bus Adams, and Luther Billis, play minor or supporting roles.

Some of the characters from the stories were merged and simplified to serve the format of the musical. For example, the coastwatcher in the musical is an American Marine (Lt. Cable) assisted by an expatriate French plantation owner (Emile de Becque). In Michener's short story "The Cave" the coastwatcher is an English expatriate assisted by native islanders, and is a disembodied voice on a short-wave radio identifying himself only as "The Remittance Man". He is never seen by the other characters in Michener's short story until a search-and-rescue party finds his head impaled on a stake. The character of Liat, Cable's lover in the film, is a much more sophisticated and intelligent young woman in the book, but is reduced to a childlike caricature in the movie. The character of Emile de Becque in Michener's short story has eight mixed-race daughters by four different women, none of whom he married, when he meets the nurse Ensign Nellie Forbush; in the musical, he has two children (one daughter and one son) by a Polynesian woman whom he had married but who had died.

Films of the musical
The Rodgers and Hammerstein musical South Pacific was made into a feature film in 1958 with scenes shot on Kauai. It was adapted as a made-for television film 2001 filmed in Queensland and Moorea.

Television
American television producer Bob Mann wanted Michener to co-create a weekly television anthology series from Tales of the South Pacific, with Michener as narrator. Rodgers and Hammerstein, however, owned all dramatic rights to the novel and did not give up ownership.  Michener did lend his name as the creator of a different and unrelated television series, Adventures in Paradise, in 1959. The series had nothing to do with World War II, but rather followed the fictional adventures of a current-day schooner sailing around the South Pacific.

See also
 Guadalcanal Campaign

References

External links
 Photos of the first edition of Tales of the South Pacific

 
Short story collections by James A. Michener
Pulitzer Prize for Fiction-winning works
1946 short story collections
American short story collections
World War II short stories
Oceania in fiction
Pacific theatre of World War II
Books about Oceania
Guadalcanal Campaign
Macmillan Publishers books
American novels adapted into films